The Ellertshäuser See is an artificial lake in the municipality Stadtlauringen in Bavaria, Germany. With a combined water area of 33 hectares, this lake is the biggest lake in Lower Franconia.

Current usage
Nowadays this lake is used mainly for recreation. Many areas are open for swimming, diving, sailing, and fishing. Other areas are Biotopes and therefore protected as Naturschutzgebiet.

References

Schweinfurt (district)
Reservoirs in Bavaria